Jacopo Ortis  is a 1916 Italian silent drama film directed by Giuseppe Sterni and based on the novel Le ultime lettere di Jacopo Ortis by Ugo Foscolo.

It was the debut film of Paola Borboni.

Plot

Cast
Ernestina Badalutti   
Paola Borboni   
Luigi Duse   
Elisa Finazzi   
Angelo Giordani   
Giulio Grassi   
Virginio Mezzetti   
Vittorio Pieri  
Felicita Prosdocimi   
Mary Cleo Tarlarini   
Carlo Trouchez

Bibliography

Title: Le ultime lettere di Jacopo Ortis
Author: Ugo Foscolo
Publisher: A. Bergnes, 1833
Page Nº: 255 p.

External links 
 
 Novel

1916 films
Italian black-and-white films
Italian silent feature films
1916 drama films
Italian drama films
1918 drama films
1918 films
Silent drama films